The New Beginning (2011) was a series of two professional wrestling pay-per-view (PPV) events promoted by New Japan Pro-Wrestling (NJPW). The events took place on February 15 and 20, 2011. The first was held in Tokyo at Korakuen Hall and the second in Sendai, Miyagi, at the Sendai Sun Plaza Hall. They were the first events held under the New Beginning name.

Storylines
Both of the New Beginning events featured nine professional wrestling matches that involved different wrestlers from pre-existing scripted feuds and storylines. Wrestlers portrayed villains, heroes, or less distinguishable characters in the scripted events that built tension and culminated in a wrestling match or series of matches.

February 15

The first event, which mainly built to matches on the second event, featured nine matches. During the event, the IWGP Tag Team Champions Giant Bernard and Karl Anderson defeated their upcoming challengers Manabu Nakanishi and Strong Man in singles matches. In the main event, IWGP Heavyweight Champion Hiroshi Tanahashi and IWGP Junior Heavyweight Champion Prince Devitt defeated their upcoming challengers, Kojima-gun representatives Satoshi Kojima and Taka Michinoku.

Results

February 20

The third match of the event saw Tiger Mask and Tomohiro Ishii conclude their storyline rivalry in a Mask vs. Mask match; for the match, Ishii donned a Black Tiger mask. All three champions retained their titles during the event; Bad Intentions (Giant Bernard and Karl Anderson) successfully defended the IWGP Tag Team Championship against Muscle Orchestra (Manabu Nakanishi and Strong Man), Prince Devitt successfully defended the IWGP Junior Heavyweight Championship against Taka Michinoku and Hiroshi Tanahashi successfully defended the IWGP Heavyweight Championship against previous champion Satoshi Kojima. The event saw the NJPW debut of former WWE wrestler MVP. He was originally scheduled to team with Nosawa Rongai, however, just prior to the event, Nosawa was arrested for stealing a taxi and later announced he was taking a break from professional wrestling.

Results

References

External links
The official New Japan Pro-Wrestling website

2011
2011 in professional wrestling
Events in Tokyo
Professional wrestling in Tokyo
2011 in Tokyo
February 2011 events in Japan